San Miguel de Valero is a municipality located in the province of Salamanca, Castile and León, Spain. As of 2016, the municipality had a population of 338 inhabitants.

References

Municipalities in the Province of Salamanca